Susanne Eberstein (born 1948) is a Swedish social democratic politician. She was member of the Riksdag from 1994 to 2018 and served as First Deputy Speaker of the Riksdag from 2010 to 2014. 
In previous terms of office, she has held positions as chairman of the Committee on Taxation 2004–2006, vice chairman of the Committee on Justice 2002–2004 and EU Affairs 2006–2010, second vice chairman of the Committee on Health and Welfare
1998–2002, and member of the Committee of Finance 1994–1998 and the General Council of the Riksbank 1998–2010.

By profession, Eberstein is a lawyer and has served as a judge of the Administrative Court of Appeals in Sundsvall. Her daughter, Anna Eberstein, is married to Hugh Grant since 2018.

External links
Susanne Eberstein at the Riksdag website

Members of the Riksdag from the Social Democrats
Living people
1948 births
Women members of the Riksdag
Members of the Riksdag 2002–2006
21st-century Swedish women politicians